The rue La Fayette is a street in the 9th district and 10th arrondissement of Paris between the rue du Faubourg Saint-Martin and the rue du Faubourg Poissonnière.

History
The street was opened in 1823. It was created by Claude Rambuteau and Georges-Eugène Haussmann. It was the original location of the Galeries Lafayette.
This street bears the name of the Marquis de La Fayette (1757-1834), hero of the American Revolutionary War.

References